Forbes Point is a small community on the southwestern shore of the Canadian province of Nova Scotia, located in the Municipality of the District of Barrington of Shelburne County.

History
Forbes Point was named after Alexander Forbes, who settled the area in the late 18th century. Stone walls from his homestead can still be found in the area. There is a small Forbes family grave site located in the woods of Forbes Point.

Geography
Forbes Point is located at N43°33.00, W65°44.55. It is bordered on three sides by the Atlantic Ocean. Much of the landscape is spruce trees and swamp.

Demographics
As of 2006, there were approximately 100 people and 35 households. The population density is estimated to be 0.4 people /km². Many current inhabitants of Forbes Point can claim direct descent from Alexander Forbes.

Economy
There is a small wharf and fish processing plant at the end of Forbes Point. Most residents make a living in the lobster fishery.

Recreation
There are a few ponds, which provide excellent grounds for catching frogs in the summer, and ice skating in the winter.

The ocean provides a refreshing place to go swimming in the summertime.

See also
 List of communities in Nova Scotia

References

External links
 Forbes Point on Destination Nova Scotia

Communities in Shelburne County, Nova Scotia
General Service Areas in Nova Scotia
Populated coastal places in Canada